The 2017 Internationaux Féminins de la Vienne was a professional tennis tournament played on indoor hard courts. It was the twenty-first edition of the tournament and was part of the 2017 ITF Women's Circuit. It took place in Poitiers, France, on 23–29 October 2017.

Singles main draw entrants

Seeds 

 1 Rankings as of 16 October 2017.

Other entrants 
The following players received a wildcard into the singles main draw:
  Belinda Bencic
  Priscilla Heise
  Chloé Paquet
  Tereza Smitková

The following player received entry using a protected ranking:
  Alexandra Dulgheru

The following players received entry from the qualifying draw:
  Kathinka von Deichmann
  Ivana Jorović
  Sofia Shapatava
  Katarina Zavatska

Champions

Singles

 Mihaela Buzărnescu def.  Alison Van Uytvanck, 6–4, 6–2

Doubles
 
 Belinda Bencic /  Yanina Wickmayer def.  Mihaela Buzărnescu /  Nicola Geuer, 7–6(9–7), 6–3

External links 
 2017 Internationaux Féminins de la Vienne at ITFtennis.com
 Official website

2017 ITF Women's Circuit
2017 in French tennis
Internationaux Féminins de la Vienne